Neighbours From Hell 2: On Vacation, known in the United States as Neighbors from Hell: On Vacation, is a comedy puzzle strategy video game developed and published by JoWooD for Microsoft Windows, Android and iOS. It is the sequel to Neighbours from Hell. It was released for Windows on February 20, 2004 in Europe and March 28, 2006 in the United States. 

On October 8, 2020, a remastered compilation of the first two games titled Neighbours Back from Hell was released on Nintendo Switch, PlayStation 4 and Xbox One. It features increased framerate and HD visuals.

Plot
Mr. Rottweiler, tired of Woody's jokes, goes on holiday around the world with his mother and girlfriend Olga. He didn't know, however that he became a star of the next season of the self-titled reality show, which is another opportunity for Woody to make pranks. In the end, the ship they travel with collides with an iceberg and sinks, but Rottweiler rescues himself finding a lifeboat, sailing ashore with his mother and unknowingly with Woody.

Gameplay
In the sequel of the game Neighbours from Hell, the player travels to various locations around the world, especially China, India and Mexico. The game is slightly harder as a new character appeared, the Neighbour's Mom, who can also beat up Woody along with her son. The player character now has three lives instead of one, and if he is spotted by the Neighbour or his Mom, Woody will be kicked to another area and lose a life. There is also a character named Olga, the woman that the Neighbour is attracted to, and player can use various things to have Olga beat him up (such as breaking the chair Neighbour is standing to and being a Peeping Tom while Olga is having shower). Olga also has a child who is often picked on by the Neighbour and he is not harmful to the player. As the game progresses, the player unlocks various new locations.

Ports and re-releases 
The original Microsoft Windows version was digitally re-released on GOG.com with the previous game by JoWood on June 9, 2009. It was released on Steam by Nordic Games on November 7, 2013 after successfully getting Greenlit by the community.

A mobile port of the game was released worldwide by THQ Nordic for iOS and Android on May 25, 2017 on the App Store and Google Play, respectively. A port for macOS was released on the App Store on June 22, 2017.

A port for Nintendo DS was released on June 30, 2009. Although its title Neighbours from Hell implies the first game, it contains only the second game from the franchise.

Notes

References

External links
Official website

2004 video games
Puzzle video games
Strategy video games
Windows games
IOS games
Android (operating system) games
macOS games
Video games developed in Austria
Video game sequels
Video games set in China
Video games set in India
Video games set in Mexico
JoWooD Entertainment games
Neighbours from Hell
THQ Nordic games
Embracer Group franchises
Works about vacationing
Single-player video games